Jean-Francois Orset (born c. 1949) is a French curler.

At the national level, he is a one-time French men's champion curler.

As of the 1987 World Championships, he was employed as a florist.

Teams

References

External links

Living people
French male curlers
French curling champions
Year of birth missing (living people)